Marco Antonio Rodríguez Moreno (born 10 November 1973 in Mexico City) is a Mexican former football referee.

Career
An international referee since 2000, Rodríguez has been selected for three FIFA World Cups. In the 2006 tournament in Germany, he refereed the England vs Paraguay match and the Côte d'Ivoire vs Serbia and Montenegro match, where he sent off Cyril Domoraud and Albert Nađ. In the 2010 tournament in South Africa, Rodríguez was match referee for the first group match between Australia and Germany, where he gave a straight red card to Australian striker Tim Cahill. He also sent off Chile's Marco Estrada during the group stage encounter between Chile and Spain.

He was selected for the 2014 tournament in Brazil, in which he took charge of 3 games including the semifinal between eventual champions Germany and hosts Brazil (7–1) on 8 July, after which he announced his retirement. During the first round, he refereed the final group D match between Uruguay and Italy on 24 June; the game finished in a 1–0 victory to Uruguay as they qualified for the knockout stage, while Italy were eliminated from the tournament. The match was surrounded by controversy, however, as Italian midfielder Claudio Marchisio was given a straight red card in the 59th minute; furthermore, later during the match, replays appeared to show Uruguayan forward Luis Suárez biting Italian defender Chiellini on the shoulder before Suárez fell and clutched his face, in Suárez's third career biting incident. As the Italian players protested to Rodríguez for not penalizing Suárez, Uruguay won a corner, from which they scored the match-winning goal. The FIFA Disciplinary Committee subsequently launched an investigation into the incident, and announced on 26 June that Suárez would be suspended for nine matches, banned from any football activity for four months, and fined CHF100,000 (approx. £65,700/€82,000/US$119,000).

In Mexico, Rodríguez developed a reputation of not being afraid to show many yellow and red cards. He was suspended for 5 games by the Mexican Federation after an incident during the Apertura 2011 final between Tigres and Santos Laguna when he showed two yellow cards at the same time to Héctor Mancilla and Carlos Adrián Morales. During the 2014 Copa Libertadores game between Atlético Nacional and Nacional, he gave the quickest red card in the history of the competition when he sent off Alejandro Bernal from Atlético Nacional after 27 seconds into the game for a harsh tackle.

In July 2014, Rodríguez announced his retirement as referee.

In August 2019, Rodríguez signed as head coach of Spanish third-tier team Salamanca CF. However, few days later and just one day before starting the league, he was sacked.

Personal life
He had the nickname "Chiquidrácula" in reference to his resemblance to a Mexican TV character of child Count Dracula, portrayed by Carlos Espejel. More recently he asked to not be called "Chiquidrácula", but rather "Chiquimarco" instead in reference to his Christian faith.

A former sports professor, he now serves as a Protestant Pastor outside of his activity as a referee.

World Cup matches officiated

References

External links
FIFA profile
Reuters profile

1973 births
Living people
2006 FIFA World Cup referees
Mexican football referees
Copa América referees
People from Mexico City
2010 FIFA World Cup referees
Mexican Protestants
CONCACAF Gold Cup referees
CONCACAF Champions League referees
FIFA World Cup referees
2014 FIFA World Cup referees
Sportspeople from Mexico City